The Journal of Psychiatric Research is a monthly peer-reviewed medical journal covering research in four major areas of psychiatry: clinical studies on normal and pathological human behavior; basic studies in psychiatry and related fields; clinical laboratory techniques such as neuroimaging, spectroscopy and other computer techniques used in research; advances in research methodology, including the clinical use of recent research findings. The journal was established in 1961 and is published by Elsevier. The current editor-in-chief is Eric Hollander (Albert Einstein College of Medicine). According to the Journal Citation Reports, the journal has a 2015 impact factor of 4.465.

References

External links 
 

Psychiatry journals
Elsevier academic journals
Monthly journals
Publications established in 1961
English-language journals